Cosmas Batubara (19 September 1938 – 8 August 2019) was an Indonesian politician. He was chairman and the co-founder of KAMI, an Indonesian anti-communist student group. He was one of the strongest proponents for the banning of the Communist Party of Indonesia and the arrest of fifteen ministers, including Subandrio.

Batubara was a parliament member in 1967–1978. He was appointed the Junior Minister of Housing in Suharto's Third Development Cabinet in 1978 and the State Minister of Housing in the 1983 Fourth Development Cabinet. In 1988, he was appointed the Minister of Manpower in the Fifth Development Cabinet. In 1991, he was appointed President of the International Labour Organization.

References

1938 births
2019 deaths
Government ministers of Indonesia
Indonesian anti-communists
People of Batak descent
People from Simalungun Regency
Indonesian Roman Catholics